Phnum Toch is a commune (khum) of Mongkol Borei District in Banteay Meanchey Province in western Cambodia.

Villages

 Phnum Touch Tboung
 Phnum Touch Cheung
 Thnal Bat
 Ou Nhor
 Boeng Tras
 Monourom
 Paoy Ta Sek
 Prey Totueng
 Boeng Reang
 Voat Thmei

References

Communes of Banteay Meanchey province
Mongkol Borey District